Plaza Centenário is an office skyscraper in the city of São Paulo located in United Nations Avenue, where there was also the construction of several commercial buildings of high standard.

Architecture 
The Centennial Plaza building, shell, metal and glass, is a monument of modern and future. Its 32 floors and 139 meters in height that is given prominence in a region with other major constructions. Its architect, Carlos Bratke, his work included among the 10 highest buildings in São Paulo, although, with the construction of new buildings, today he became the 12th highest in the city, and is also the 16th tallest building Brazil. In addition to a cyber cafe and an auditorium at the top of the building there is even a heliport. The Centennial Plaza is one of the most "intelligent" buildings in São Paulo. Pioneering work in the country, the building received about 40 thousand square meters of aluminum composite panels. The work of 77,500 square meters, took eight years to be built.

See also

 List of tallest buildings in South America
 Eldorado Business Tower
 Mirante do Vale
 Edifício Copan

Skyscrapers in São Paulo
Skyscraper office buildings in Brazil

Office buildings completed in 1995